Thopeutica is a genus of beetles in the family Cicindelidae, containing the following species:

 Thopeutica afonini Matalin, 1998
 Thopeutica albapicalis (W.Horn, 1892)
 Thopeutica albolabiata Cassola & Brzoska, 2008
 Thopeutica alexanderriedeli Werner & Wiesner, 1999
 Thopeutica allardiana Cassola, 1991
 Thopeutica angulihumerosa (W.Horn, 1929)
 Thopeutica apiceflava Cassola, 1991
 Thopeutica aurothoracica (W.Horn, 1897)
 Thopeutica banggai (Cassola, 1991)
 Thopeutica basidondo Cassola & Brzoska, 2008
 Thopeutica beccarii Cassola, 1991
 Thopeutica boettcheri Cassola & Ward, 2004
 Thopeutica brendelli (Cassola, 1991)
 Thopeutica bugis Cassola, 1991
 Thopeutica butonensis (Cassola, 1996)
 Thopeutica clara (Schaum 1860)
 Thopeutica conspicua (Schaum, 1862)
 Thopeutica curvipenis (Cassola & Wiesner, 2001)
 Thopeutica darlingtonia Cassola & Ward, 2004
 Thopeutica davaoensis Cassola & Ward, 2004
 Thopeutica diana (J.Thomson, 1859)
 Thopeutica djufriana Matalin, 1998
 Thopeutica duffelsi (Cassola, 1991)
 Thopeutica dumogabonei (Cassola, 1991)
 Thopeutica eanula (W.Horn, 1905)
 Thopeutica eustalacta (Schaum, 1861)
 Thopeutica eximia (Linden, 1829)
 Thopeutica flavilabris (W.Horn, 1913)
 Thopeutica fugax (Schaum, 1862)
 Thopeutica fulvescens W.Horn, 1892
 Thopeutica gerstmeieri Werner & Wiesner, 1997
 Thopeutica glorioparadoxa (W.Horn, 1913)
 Thopeutica gloriosa (Schaum 1861)
 Thopeutica gloriosula (W.Horn, 1913)
 Thopeutica grossipenis Cassola & Brzoska, 2008
 Thopeutica guttula (Fabricius, 1801)
 Thopeutica haffendeni Cassola & Brzoska, 2008
 Thopeutica hiro Cassola, 1991
 Thopeutica hirofumii (Cassola, 1991)
 Thopeutica horii (Cassola, 1991)
 Thopeutica judithae Cassola & Brzoska, 2008
 Thopeutica kalisi (Cassola, 1991)
 Thopeutica kobayashii (Cassola, 1991)
 Thopeutica krikkeni (Cassola, 1991)
 Thopeutica kurbatovi (Matalin, 1998)
 Thopeutica labrosetosa Cassola & Brzoska, 2008
 Thopeutica luwuk Cassola, 1991
 Thopeutica luzona Cassola & Ward, 2004
 Thopeutica major Cassola, 1991
 Thopeutica microcephala (W.Horn, 1924)
 Thopeutica milanae Wiesner, 1992
 Thopeutica naja Cassola & Brzoska, 2008
 Thopeutica negrosicola Cassola & Ward, 2004
 Thopeutica nishiyamai (Cassola, 1991)
 Thopeutica palawanensis Cassola & Ward, 2004
 Thopeutica parva Cassola, 1991
 Thopeutica paulina Cassola & Brzoska, 2008
 Thopeutica perconspicua Cassola & Ward, 2004
 Thopeutica posoana Cassola & Brzoska, 2008
 Thopeutica problematica (Cassola, 1996)
 Thopeutica prolongata (Kirby, 1985)
 Thopeutica pseudofulvescens (Cassola & Wiesner, 2001)
 Thopeutica pseudointerposita (W.Horn, 1924)
 Thopeutica pseudoluzona Cassola & Ward, 2004
 Thopeutica pseudopaluensis Sawada & Wiesner, 1994
 Thopeutica pseudoschaumi Cassola & Brzoska, 2008
 Thopeutica punctipennis (Jordan, 1894)
 Thopeutica rolandmuelleri Cassola, 2000
 Thopeutica rugothoracica (W.Horn, 1907)
 Thopeutica sabiri Cassola & Brzoska, 2008
 Thopeutica sawadai Cassola, 1991
 Thopeutica schaumi (W.Horn, 1892)
 Thopeutica simulatrix (W.Horn, 1896)
 Thopeutica sphaericollis (W.Horn, 19319
 Thopeutica stenodera (Schaum, 1861)
 Thopeutica storki (Cassola, 1991)
 Thopeutica suavis (W.Horn, 1896)
 Thopeutica suavissima (Schaum, 1862)
 Thopeutica subaurothoracica Cassola & Brzoska, 2008
 Thopeutica tambusisii (Kirby, 1985)
 Thopeutica theratoides (Schaum, 1861)
 Thopeutica togiana (Cassola, 1991)
 Thopeutica toraja Cassola, 1991
 Thopeutica triangulomicans (W.Horn, 1942)
 Thopeutica vantoli Cassola, 1991
 Thopeutica virginalis (W.Horn, 1901)
 Thopeutica virginea (Schaum 1860)
 Thopeutica waltheri (Heller, 1896)
 Thopeutica werneriana Cassola, 1991
 Thopeutica whitteni Cassola, 1991
 Thopeutica zetteli Cassola & Ward, 2004

References

Cicindelidae